Aleksey Anatolyevich Konsovsky (28 January 1912 – 20 July 1991) was a Soviet and Russian film, stage and voice actor. People's Artist of the RSFSR (1976).

Biography 
He was born in Moscow to a working class family.

He was married to Vera Altayskaya, an actress with whom they appeared together in most of the movies.

He died in Moscow and was buried in the Vagankovo Cemetery.

Awards and honors 

 Order of the Badge of Honour (1949)
 Honored Artist of the RSFSR (1964)
 Vasilyev Brothers State Prize of the RSFSR (1966)
 People's Artist of the RSFSR (1976)

Filmography

References

External links 

1912 births
1991 deaths
20th-century Russian male actors
Male actors from Moscow
Honored Artists of the RSFSR
People's Artists of the RSFSR
Recipients of the Vasilyev Brothers State Prize of the RSFSR
Russian male film actors
Russian male stage actors
Russian male voice actors
Soviet male film actors
Soviet male stage actors
Soviet male voice actors
Spoken word artists
Burials at Vagankovo Cemetery